The Unsan Line is a former non-electrified narrow gauge line of the Korean State Railway in North P'yŏngan Province, North Korea, running from Puksinhyŏl-li, Hyangsan County on the Manp'o Line to Samsal-ri, Unsan County.

History
The Unsan Line was originally opened by the Korean State Railway in the 1970s; it was closed some time in the 1990s.

Trains on the line were pulled by Czechoslovakian-built 400 series 0-6-0T steam tank locomotives.

By December 2003, there was little that remained of the line, with only the bridge abutments leaving Puksinhyon station being visible and no buildings or locomotives seen.

Routes

A yellow background in the "Distance" box indicates that section of the line is not electrified; a pink background indicates that section is  narrow gauge; an orange background indicates that section is non-electrified narrow gauge.

References

Railway lines in North Korea
2 ft 6 in gauge railways in North Korea